Kishida Cabinet may refer to:

 First Kishida Cabinet
 Second Kishida Cabinet